El engaño (English title:The deception) is a Mexican telenovela produced by Ernesto Alonso for Televisa in 1986. It is an original story by Caridad Bravo Adams, adapted by Fernanda Villeli and directed by Sergio Jiménez.

Erika Buenfil, Frank Moro and Guillermo García Cantú starred as protagonists, while Sergio Jiménez and Luz María Jerez starred as main antagonists.

Plot
In Valle de Bravo, Alfonso and his wife Aminta lead a hermit life. Alfonso has good reasons for this: and hiding his Nazi past and present criminal filled with links to neo-Nazi groups. Aminta who adores her husband, ignores these facts and suffers because his health was broken following the birth of his daughter Mindy. Jorge the painter, a resident of Alfonso, finds an abandoned baby and decides to take Amanta to look after her.

This infuriates Alfonso, who is awaiting the arrival of his orphaned nephews who come to live with him and forces his wife to get rid of the girl. Jorge decides to adopt her and puts Marcela. Aminta health deteriorates and eventually dies of cardiac arrest. They spend 18 years, and Alfonso remains linked to his Nazi activities. His daughter Mindy is a capricious and cruel girl who likes to flirt with her cousins. Rodrigo, the youngest of them falls for her and then making love believes to be married.

However both Alfonso and Mindy prefer her to marry Gerardo's brother Rodrigo, a strange guy, medium and neurotic suffering from constant blackouts after which he does not remember where he was or what he did. Meanwhile, Marcela over the years has become a beautiful young, but very self-conscious. Jorge travels to Miami where she is studying to attend their prom. Jorge has big plans for her. Gerardo also travels to Miami and coincides with Marcela, both fall in love at first sight. After a short courtship marry and return to Valle del Bravo.

His arrival coincides with that of David, a frail old Jew, who arrives with her child nurses seeking his son left 18 years ago. This child is being Marcela, and it turns out that the seemingly defenseless David is a survivor of Nazi concentration camps that aims to expose Alfonso.

Cast 
 
Erika Buenfil as Marcela Estévez
Frank Moro as Jorge Estévez
Sergio Jiménez as Alfonso Gunther/Dieter Von Heune
Luz María Jerez as Aminta Alvírez de Gunther/Mindy Gunther
Guillermo García Cantú as Gerardo
Rafael Sánchez Navarro as Rodrigo
Eduardo Alcaraz as David Letterman
Carmen Montejo as Doña Selene
Susana Alexander as Elena
Rafael Amador as Lt. Quintanilla
Socorro Avelar as Chuy
Yolanda Ciani as Clara
Gabriela Goldsmith as Rocío Peña
Gilberto Román as Javier Peña
Jorge del Campo as Franz
Mónica Miguel as Carmen
Carlos Gajardo as Rubén
Toño Infante as Lt. Rómulo Sánchez
Marcela Páez as Adela Sánchez
Jerardo as Samuel
Rosita Salazar as Alice
José D'Merlo as Thomas/Sammy
René Escandón as Renato
César Adrián Sánchez as Carlos
José Carlos Teruel as Isaac
Rafael Rojas as Reynaldo
Xavier Masse as Rogers
Marco Hernández as Tony Suárez
Alicia Montoya as Martha
Norma Reyes as Alma
Edgardo Gazcón as Fernando
Mariana Gaja as Marcela (child)
Tenderly Prats as Mindy (child)
Tanya Pelejero as Rocío (child)
Graciela Galicia as Operator
Pedro Zavala as Father
Felipe González as Doctor
Ricardo Rivero as Judge
Rubén Díaz as Chauffeur
Fernando Manzano as Announcer
Enrique Borja Baena
Rolando Barral
Rebeca Silva

Awards

References

External links

1986 telenovelas
Mexican telenovelas
1986 Mexican television series debuts
1986 Mexican television series endings
Spanish-language telenovelas
Television shows set in Mexico City
Televisa telenovelas